Brouwershaven is a small city on the Grevelingen in the Dutch province of Zeeland. It is a part of the municipality of Schouwen-Duiveland, lies about 45 km southwest of Hellevoetsluis and 10 km north of Zierikzee.

Brouwershaven received city rights in 1477.

In 2001, the town of Brouwershaven had 1307 inhabitants. The built-up area of the town was 0.39 km2, and contained 705 residences.
The statistical area "Brouwershaven", which also can include the surrounding countryside, has a population of around 1540.

Brouwershaven was a separate municipality until 1997, when it was merged into Schouwen-Duiveland.

History
Brouwershaven was founded in 1285AD as new harbor for Brijdorpe although today the harbor was silted up. The town was built as a fortified bastide, and is considered to be the first  of this type of settlement in the Netherlands.
  
The name Brouwershaven (Brewers Haven) is anecdotally thought of to have originated from the import of Beer from Delft through the port. and is first mentioned in 1318AD. In 1403 the city got town rights but had no seat in the States of Zeeland.

The history of Brouwershaven has always had a connection with the water. The fish and shellfish was an important source of income as was trade in wine and beer, wood, stone, wool and flax, turnips and beets. Another staple industry of the town is salt from evaporated seawater.

In 1575 the little Bastide town was conquered by Spanish troops and then set on fire. From 1590 Brouwershaven was provided with earthen ramparts, surrounded by a moat. Five gates gave access to the city. When the flood of 1682 a part of the fortifications were destroyed. The fortress was disbanded in 1820, ramparts and moats to the east and north sides of the city however, are preserved.

The 17th century was a heyday for the fishing port. However, with the development of larger ships came the problem of accessing the narrow port entrance and its economy began to decline.

In the 19th century Brouwershaven experienced a slight revival when the Brielle Meuse and Goereese Gat silted up. Rotterdam threatened to become unreachable for ships so some shipping stopped in  Brouwershaven, where the cargo was transferred to smaller vessels. The government also built a large office for pilotage and for the tax authorities there. However, a new canal in 1872 eliminated is function in favor of Rotterdam again.

After the floods of 1953 improved connections and the Delta Works, the construction of a marina and promotion of tourism, have once again improved  the civic life of the town.

Heraldry

A shield for the town appears  as early as 1540 and consists of a gold eagle sable, the arms of Louis of Bavaria, with chest arms of his wife Margrethe II of Hainaut. This diamond-shaped shield has four lions the position which has changed over time, in the current version they are away and turn each other in pairs. In addition to the eagle stands in gold a lion rampant gules (red), from the shield of Holland. The shield is covered by a golden crown with five leaves. Such a heraldic crown was actually awarded only to towns with a seat on the provincial council and Brouwershaven was granted this improperly in this case because Brouwershaven never had a seat in the States of Zeeland.

The shield was confirmed as municipal coat of arms on July 31, 1817. After the local government reorganization of 1961 the Shield was retained for the new municipality.

References

Images

Schouwen-Duiveland
History of Schouwen-Duiveland
Populated places in Zeeland
Former municipalities of Zeeland
Municipalities of the Netherlands disestablished in 1997
Populated coastal places in the Netherlands